Sir Edward Fitzgerald Campbell, 2nd Baronet (25 October 1822 – 23 November 1882) was a British baronet and soldier.

His father was Sir Guy Campbell, 1st Baronet. His mother was the only daughter of Lord Edward Fitzgerald. He fought in the Punjab Expedition in 1849, the Afridis Expedition in 1850, and the Siege of Delhi in 1858. He was Aide de Camp  to the Commander-in-Chief, India.  He was promoted to Major in 1858; and ended his military career as Lieutenant-Colonel  of the 60th Foot.

References

1822 births
1882 deaths
Baronets in the Baronetage of the United Kingdom